694 Ekard is a minor planet orbiting the Sun that was discovered by American astronomer Joel Hastings Metcalf on November 7, 1909. The asteroid's name comes from the reverse spelling of Drake University in Des Moines, Iowa, where Seth Barnes Nicholson and his wife calculated its orbit.

Photometric observations of this asteroid gave a light curve with a period of 5.925 hours and a brightness variation of 0.50 in magnitude. Measurements of the thermal inertia of 694 Ekard  give a value of around 100–140 J m−2 K−1 s−1/2, compared to 50 for lunar regolith and 400 for coarse sand in an atmosphere.

13-cm radar observations of this asteroid from the Arecibo Observatory between 1980 and 1985 were used to produce a diameter estimate of 101 km. Four separate stellar occultation events involving this asteroid were observed from multiple sites in 2009.

References

External links
 
 

Background asteroids
Ekard
Ekard
CP:-type asteroids (Tholen)
19091107